HMS Medway's Prize was a 28-gun sixth rate take by HMS Medway on 17 August 1704. She was registered as a Royal Navy Vessel on 6 September 1704. She was commissioned into the Royal Navy in 1705 for service in Home Waters then Jamaica. She was sold in late 1713.

Medway's Prize (Either Medway's Prize or Medway) was the fourteenth named ship since it was used for a 60-gun fourth rate, launched at Sheerness Dockyard on 20 September 1693, rebuilt in 1718, hulk in 1740, beached as a sheer hulk on 18 November 1748 at Portsmouth and broken at Portsmouth in October 1749.

Specifications
She was captured on 17 August 1704 and registered on 6 September 1704. Her tonnage calculation was  tons. Her armament was twenty-eight 6-pounders on wooden trucks.

Commissioned Service
She was commissioned in 1705 under the command of Commander Thomas Hughes, RN for service in the Mediterranean. In 1709 Commander Thomas Beverley, RN took command for service in Home Waters. On or about 10 June 1709 Captain Charles Brown, RN took command followed by Commander John Fletcher, RN in 1710 for service with the Fleet. In 1711 Captain William Basille, RN took over command for service at Jamaica.

Disposition
She was sold in late 1713 at Jamaica.

Citations

References
 Winfield, British Warships in the Age of Sail (1603 – 1714), by Rif Winfield, published by Seaforth Publishing, England © 2009, EPUB , Chapter 6, The Sixth Rates, Vessels acquired from 18 December 1688, Sixth Rates of 20 guns and up to 26 guns, Ex-French Prizes (1704–09), Medway's Prize
 Colledge, Ships of the Royal Navy, by J.J. Colledge, revised and updated by Lt Cdr Ben Warlow and Steve Bush, published by Seaforth Publishing, Barnsley, Great Britain, © 2020, e  (EPUB), Section S (Medway, Medway's Prize)

 

1700s ships
Corvettes of the Royal Navy
Naval ships of the United Kingdom